The South Korea men's national squash team represents South Korea in international squash team competitions, and is governed by Korea Squash Federation.

Current team
 JaeJin Yoo
 Ko Youngjo
 Jong Myoung Park
 Han Dong Ryu

Results

World Team Squash Championships

Asian Squash Team Championships

See also 
 Korea Squash Federation
 World Team Squash Championships

References 

Squash teams
Men's national squash teams
Squash